Michael Lukow (born 8 June 1986) also known as the Blue Falcon, is an American Soldier who competes as a Paralympic recurve archer. He won silver medals at the 2011 Parapan American Games, Silver in team round at the 2017 world championships in Beijing China, Gold in team round at the 2019 World Championships in Netherlands, and 2014 Pan American Championships and placed 23rd in ranking round and tied 17th at the 2016 Paralympics.

The third child from Bruce Lukow (retired Alamosa Police Officer for 41 years) and Rikki Lukow (stay at home mom).  Michael has three siblings. Two older brothers and a younger sister. Michael grew up in Alamosa, Colorado.  He attended Trinity Lutheran Preschool and Sangre De Cristo Elementary, Middle, and High School.  Michael married Nikita Machesky after his injuries.  They were married at Trinity Lutheran Church in Alamosa, Colorado.  They have two kids.

In 2005 Lukow joined the U.S. Army and later was deployed to Iraq. On 30 January 2008 he lost his right foot and damaged his left foot in an IED explosion in Baghdad. He took up archery as a mental and physical aid to recover from injuries. Lukow was awarded the Iraq Campaign Medal, Purple Heart and National Defense Service Medal.

References

1986 births
Living people
American male archers
Paralympic archers of the United States
Archers at the 2016 Summer Paralympics
Sportspeople from Colorado
People from Alamosa, Colorado
Military personnel from Colorado
United States Army personnel of the Iraq War
U.S. Army World Class Athlete Program
21st-century American people